Daigo is both a masculine Japanese given name and a surname. Notable people with the name include:

Surname
Daigo Fuyumoto (1648–1697), Japanese court noble who founded the family branch
Naoyuki Daigo (born 1981), Japanese high jumper
Tadashige Daigo (1891–1947), Imperial Japanese Navy admiral during World War II
, Japanese baseball player
Toshirō Daigo (born 1926), Japanese 10th dan judoka

Given name
, Japanese footballer
, Japanese footballer
, Japanese freestyle skier
, Japanese athlete
, Japanese boxer
Daigo Hisateru (1937–1983), Japanese sumo wrestler
Daigō Kenshi (born 1952), Japanese sumo wrestler
, footballer
, Japanese screenwriter and film director
, Japanese politician
, Japanese musician, main vocalist of Breakerz
, Japanese footballer
, Japanese professional drifting driver
, Japanese footballer
, Japanese professional video gamer
, Japanese footballer

Japanese-language surnames
Japanese masculine given names